Horse and Rider is a modern equestrian bronze sculpture by Marino Marini.
Executed in 1952–1953, it is located at the Hirshhorn Museum and Sculpture Garden.

After the Second World War, Marini developed a horse and rider theme, where the figure is not in control of his mount.

See also
 List of public art in Washington, D.C., Ward 2

References

External links
The Hirshhorn Sculpture Gardens
Horse and Rider, (sculpture)., SIRIS

Modernist sculpture
1953 sculptures
Hirshhorn Museum and Sculpture Garden
Sculptures of the Smithsonian Institution
Bronze sculptures in Washington, D.C.
Equestrian statues in Washington, D.C.
Outdoor sculptures in Washington, D.C.